B95 may refer to:

 B95, a postcode district in the B postcode area of the United Kingdom
 Sicilian Defence, Najdorf Variation, according to the list of chess openings
 Beechcraft Travel Air, a twin-engine development of the Beechcraft Bonanza
 A model of Berkeley Cars produced in 1959 and 1960
 B95 (bird), an unusually long-lived Red Knot bird
 Fossickers Way, a road in New South Wales, Australia

Radio stations:
 KBOS-FM, a rhythmic contemporary radio station licensed to Fresno, California
 WBBN, a country radio station licensed to Taylorsville, Mississippi
 WFBE, a country radio station licensed to Flint, Michigan
 WQRB, a country radio station licensed to Bloomer, Wisconsin
 WYJB, an adult contemporary radio station licensed to Albany, New York